Manuel Antonio Aybar (born May 4, 1972) is a retired  pitcher who has played in Major League Baseball and Korea Baseball Organization. He bats and throws right-handed.

He made his major league debut on August 4, with St. Louis in a 4–2 loss to the New York Mets. After that, he was unable to fully establish himself as a major leaguer, spending time in the Colorado Rockies, Cincinnati Reds, Chicago Cubs, Florida Marlins, Tampa Bay Devil Rays, San Francisco Giants, New York Mets and LG Twins organizations at both the major league and Triple-A levels and in Korean baseball. Aybar played for the Dorados de Chihuahua of the Mexican League for the 2010 season.

In 2015, he served as pitching coach for the DSL Mets 1.

References

External links

1972 births
Arkansas Travelers players
Chicago Cubs players
Cincinnati Reds players
Colorado Rockies players
Dominican Republic expatriate baseball players in South Korea
Dominican Republic expatriate baseball players in Taiwan
Dominican Republic expatriate baseball players in the United States
Durham Bulls players
Florida Marlins players
Fresno Grizzlies players
Iowa Cubs players
KBO League pitchers
LG Twins players
Living people
Louisville Redbirds players
Louisville RiverBats players
Major League Baseball pitchers
Major League Baseball players from the Dominican Republic
Memphis Redbirds players
New York Mets players
Norfolk Tides players
People from Baní
San Francisco Giants players
Savannah Cardinals players
St. Louis Cardinals players
St. Petersburg Cardinals players